A total of 18 manga titles have made first appearances in 2011. As of the 33rd week, nine titles reached the top of the weekly list (in order of number of weeks at the top of the list, from highest to lowest): Naruto, 12 weeks; Black Bird, 4 weeks; Hetalia: Axis Powers, 4 weeks; Black Butler, 3 weeks; Rosario + Vampire: Season II, 3 weeks; Yu-Gi-Oh! GX, 3 weeks; Negima!, 2 weeks; Fullmetal Alchemist, 1 week; and Maximum Ride, 1 week.

Deb Aoki noted that while the second volume of Hetalia: Axis Powers debuted at the top of the Best Seller list, the series may be selling more than the charts indicate because The New York Times does not include sales from digital download sites such as comiXology and Zinio. Black Butler became the first title other than Naruto to have four different releases listed simultaneously on the rankings in week 5. Week 24 saw a high turnover from the previous week's list as nine new releases, all published by Viz Media, entered the rankings. The high turnover occurred again in week 28 when eight new releases entered the weekly list, with only Naruto and Vampire Knight remaining from the previous week.

Weeks are numbered according to the convention used in the United States, which labels the week containing January 1 as the first week of the year.

Fan book release

Light novel release

References

External links
The New York Times Manga Best Seller list
Weekly introductions of The New York Times Graphic Books Best Seller lists

2011
Manga industry
2011 in comics
The New York Times Manga Best Sellers of 2011